Héctor Hernández Ortega (born 23 May 1991), sometimes known as Litri, is a Spanish professional footballer who plays as a left-back.

Club career
Born in Valladolid, Castile and León, Hernández finished his development with Real Zaragoza after previous stints at CD Victoria CF and CD Betis de Valladolid CF. He made his debut as a senior with the reserves in the 2010–11 season, in Tercera División.

Hernández made his first-team debut on 23 January 2013, coming on as a second-half substitute for Víctor Rodríguez in a 4–0 away loss against Sevilla FC in the quarter-finals of the Copa del Rey. He first appeared in La Liga on 10 February, starting and being sent off in a 1–2 home defeat to Real Sociedad.

On 15 July 2013, Hernández moved to another reserve team, Real Sociedad B from Segunda División B. He signed a new two-year contract with the club on 13 May 2015, being promoted to the main squad on 20 August.

Hernández made his competitive debut for the Txuri-urdin on 28 November 2015, replacing Imanol Agirretxe in a 4–0 loss at FC Barcelona. On 18 June of the following year, he agreed to a two-year extension until 2019.

On 30 January 2017, Hernández was loaned to fellow league side Granada CF until June. On 17 February, he was the only national player fielded by manager Lucas Alcaraz in a 4–1 home win over Real Betis as the Nazaríes lined up with 11 different nationalities.

On 11 June 2017, Hernández joined fellow top-tier team Deportivo Alavés on loan for one year. Having been rarely used, he terminated his contract with Real on 30 August 2018 and signed with Segunda División's CD Tenerife just hours later.

On 15 July 2019, Hernández joined CD Numancia. On 12 September 2020, after suffering relegation, he signed a two-year deal with Deportivo de La Coruña, also relegated to division three.

Career statistics

Club

References

External links

1991 births
Living people
Spanish footballers
Footballers from Valladolid
Association football defenders
La Liga players
Segunda División players
Segunda División B players
Tercera División players
Primera Federación players
Real Zaragoza B players
Real Zaragoza players
Real Sociedad footballers
Granada CF footballers
Deportivo Alavés players
CD Tenerife players
CD Numancia players
Deportivo de La Coruña players